Sidra is a given name of Latin origin meaning "Goddess of the stars" or "like a star". The name Sidrah is also an Islamic name, short for Sidrat al-Muntaha, a holy tree at the end of the seventh heaven.

People
Sidra Sadaf, Pakistani woman cyclist
Eddy Sidra (born 1989), Sudanese-born Canadian football player.

Fictional
Sidra, the God of Destruction of Universe 9 in Dragon Ball Super
Sidra, one of the viewpoint characters in the novel A Closed and Common Orbit
On “Seinfeld,” Jerry's crush, played by Teri Hatcher

References